Epicrates assisi is a species of snake in the family Boidae. The species is found in Brazil.

References 

Epicrates
Reptiles of Brazil
Reptiles described in 1945